The Quartermaster-General to the Forces (QMG) is a senior general in the British Army. The post has become symbolic: the Ministry of Defence organisation charts since 2011 have not used the term "Quartermaster-General to the Forces"; they simply refer to "Chief of Materiel (Land)".

History
A Quartermaster-General first appears in English Army records in 1667; as a permanently established post it dates from 1686.

Responsibilities
To begin with the Quartermaster-General was (like the Adjutant-General) a senior staff officer of the Commander-in-Chief of the Forces, responsible for the movement and quartering of troops. From the 1680s to the 1880s the QMG periodically had responsibility for military intelligence in addition.

In 1888 the Quartermaster-General took over responsibility for the transport and supply of equipment, provisions and munitions, formerly overseen by the Commissariat and Transport Department and the Surveyor-General of the Ordnance. From 1904 the Quartermaster-General to the Forces was the Third Military Member of the Army Council (1904) and its successor the Army Board.

The appointment of a Deputy Quartermaster-General dates from 1710 and Assistant Quartermasters-General are recorded from as early as 1692.

Present day
In modern use the QMG is the senior General Officer in the army holding a logistics appointment and is currently the Lieutenant General holding the post of Chief of Materiel (Land) (CoM(L)) within Defence Equipment and Support. The CoM(L) sits upon the highest committee within the army, the Army Board.

Recent holders of the post
Holders of the post have included:
1712–1742 Major-General John Armstrong
1742–1763 Lieutenant-General Humphrey Bland
1763–1796 Lieutenant-General George Morrison
1796–1803 Lieutenant-General Sir David Dundas
1803–1811 Lieutenant-General Sir Robert Brownrigg
1811–1851 General Sir James Gordon
1851–1855 Lieutenant-General Sir James Freeth
1855–1865 Lieutenant-General Sir Richard Airey
1865–1870 Lieutenant-General Sir Hope Grant
1870–1871 General Sir Frederick Haines
1871–1876 General Sir Charles Ellice
1876–1880 General Sir Daniel Lysons
1880–1882 Lieutenant-General Sir Garnet Wolseley
1882–1887 General Sir Arthur Herbert
1887–1890 Major-General Sir Redvers Buller
1890–1893 Lieutenant-General Sir Thomas Baker
1893 General Sir Robert Biddulph
1893–1897 General Sir Evelyn Wood
1897–1898 General Sir Richard Harrison
1898–1899 General Sir George Stuart White
1899–1903 General Sir Charles Clarke
1903–1904 General Sir Ian Hamilton
1904–1905 General Sir Herbert Plumer
1905–1908 General Sir William Nicholson
1908–1912 Lieutenant-General Sir Herbert Miles
1912–1919 General Sir John Cowans
1919–1923 Lieutenant-General Sir Travers Clarke
1923–1927 Lieutenant-General Sir Walter Campbell
1927–1930 Lieutenant-General Sir Hastings Anderson
1931–1934 General Sir Felix Ready
1935–1939 General Sir Reginald May
1939–1942 General Sir Walter Venning
1942–1946 General Sir Thomas Riddell-Webster
1946–1947 General Sir Daril Watson
1947–1950 General Sir Sidney Kirkman
1950–1952 General Sir Ivor Thomas
1952–1955 General Sir Ouvry Roberts
1955–1956 Lieutenant-General Maurice Chilton
1956–1958 General Sir Nevil Brownjohn
1958–1961 General Sir Cecil Sugden
1961–1965 General Sir Gerald Lathbury
1965–1966 General Sir Charles Richardson
1966–1969 General Sir Alan Jolly
1969–1973 General Sir Anthony Read
1973–1977 General Sir William Jackson
1977–1979 General Sir Patrick Howard-Dobson
1979–1982 General Sir Richard Worsley
1982–1983 Lieutenant-General Sir Paul Travers
1983–1986 General Sir Richard Trant
1986–1988 General Sir Charles Huxtable
1988–1991 General Sir Edward Jones
1991–1994 General Sir John Learmont
1994–1996 Lieutenant General Sir William Rous
1996–1998 Lieutenant General Sir Samuel Cowan
1998–2000 Lieutenant General Sir Scott Grant
2000–2002 Major-General David Judd
2002–2006 Major-General Anthony Raper
2006–2007 Major-General Timothy Tyler
2007–2009 Lieutenant General Dick Applegate
2009–2012 Lieutenant General Gary Coward
2012–2016 Lieutenant General Sir Christopher Deverell
2016–2019 Lieutenant General Paul Jaques

References

Senior appointments of the British Army
War Office
War Office in World War II